Ali Naajih (born 8 December 1999) is a Maldivian professional footballer who plays as a goalkeeper for United Victory.

Club career 
Ali Naajih started training with New Radiant youth team in 2019 and after they got suspended, he moved to United Victory and played in FAM Youth Championship with United Victory.

He became a regular starter for United Victory in Dhivehi Premier League after Ihusan Abdhul Ghanee took over.

On 22 April 2022 against Club Valencia (Maldives) he got the Man of the Match award for his performance; this was the first time a local goalkeeper won the Man of the match in the 2019-2020 season and first one to win it since 3 January 2020.

International career 
Naajih was first called up to the Maldives U23 National Football Team in February 2019, for the 220 AFC U-23 Championship qualification in Saudi Arabia. He was also included in the squad of Maldives U23 National Football Team for the 2019 South Asian Games in Nepal.

He made his international debut on 25 October 2021, in a 4–0 defeat against Iraq national under-23 football team for the 2022 AFC U-23 Asian Cup qualification in Bahrain.

His debut for the Maldives national football team was made on 9 November 2021 against Sri Lanka national football team in the 2021 Four Nations Football Tournament, a friendly tournament held in Sri Lanka.

Career Statistics

Club

References

External links 
 
 
 
 The Maldives under-23 football squad is on their way to Bahrain

1999 births
Living people
Association football goalkeepers
Maldivian footballers
United Victory players